Stenocerus is a genus of fungus weevils in the beetle family Anthribidae. There are more than 20 described species in Stenocerus.

Species
These 29 species belong to the genus Stenocerus:

 Stenocerus amazonae Jekel, 1855
 Stenocerus anatinus Perty, 1832
 Stenocerus angulicollis Jekel, 1855
 Stenocerus aspis Erichson, 1847
 Stenocerus blanchardi Jekel, 1855
 Stenocerus brunnescens Jekel, 1855
 Stenocerus collaris Gyllenhal, 1833
 Stenocerus frontalis Gyllenhal, 1833
 Stenocerus fulvitarsis Schoenherr, 1833
 Stenocerus garnotii Boisduval, 1835
 Stenocerus knullorum Sleeper, 1953
 Stenocerus longulus Jekel, 1855
 Stenocerus mexicanus Jekel, 1855
 Stenocerus migratorius Jekel, 1855
 Stenocerus nigritasis Jordan, 1895
 Stenocerus nigrotesselatus Blanchard, 1843
 Stenocerus nigrotessellatus Blanchard, 1846
 Stenocerus nubifer Schoenherr, 1823
 Stenocerus paraguayensis Jordan, 1895
 Stenocerus platalea Jordan, 1906
 Stenocerus sigillatus Jordan, 1906
 Stenocerus tesselatus Desmarest & E., 1842
 Stenocerus tessellatus Jekel, 1855
 Stenocerus testudo Jekel, 1855
 Stenocerus tuberculosus Blanchard, 1849
 Stenocerus variegatus Motschulsky, 1874
 Stenocerus varipes Fahraeus, 1839
 Stenocerus velatus Erichson, 1847
 Stenocerus verticalis Jekel, 1855

References

Further reading

 
 

Anthribidae
Articles created by Qbugbot